Mbarouk Said Ali (born 20 June 1962) is a Tanzanian ACT Wazalendo politician and Member of Parliament for Wete constituency since 2010.

References

Living people
1962 births
Civic United Front MPs
Tanzanian MPs 2010–2015
Utaani Secondary School alumni
Ole Secondary School alumni
Sokoine University of Agriculture alumni
Zanzibari politicians
Alliance for Change and Transparency politicians